The Colorado River Basin Salinity Control Program was authorized in the Colorado River Basin Salinity Control Act and was repealed and replaced by the Environmental Quality Incentives Program (EQIP) in the 1996 farm bill (P.L. 104-127). Administered by the Natural Resources Conservation Service, it was used to implement salinity control measures, primarily to manage irrigation water using financial and technical assistance to landowners.  This program supported U.S. efforts to meet international treaty obligations for downstream water quality in Mexico. The Department of the Interior's Bureau of Reclamation administers its own Colorado River Salinity control Program.

References 

United States Department of Agriculture programs